Erythracaridae is a family of mites in the order Trombidiformes. There are seven genera accepted within Erythracaridae.

Genera
These seven genera belong to the family Erythracaridae:
 Chaussieria Oudemans, 1937
 Erythracarus Berlese, 1903
 Lacteoscythis Pogrebnyak, 1995
 Paratarsotomus Kuznetsov, 1983
 Syblia Oudemans, 1936
 Tarsolarkus Thor, 1912
 Tarsotomus'' Berlese, 1882

References

Further reading

 
 
 

Trombidiformes
Acari families